is the debut studio album by Japanese singer Shizuka Kudo. It was released on January 21, 1988, through Pony Canyon. Mysterious was re-issued in gold CD on March 21, 1991, and later in APO-CD format on December 1, 1995.

Commercial performance
Mysterious debuted at number three on the Oricon Albums Chart, with 62,000 units sold in its first week. It stayed at number three the following week. The album charted in the top 100 for seventeen weeks, of which seven where spent in the top twenty, selling a reported total of 233,000 copies during its run. Mysterious was ranked number 40 on the year-end Oricon Albums Chart.

Track listing
All tracks composed and arranged by Tsugutoshi Gotō.

Charts

Release history

References

1988 debut albums
Shizuka Kudo albums
Pony Canyon albums